Chekkeh Ab (also Romanized as Chekkeh Āb; also known as Chek Āb) is a village in Bajestan Rural District, in the Central District of Bajestan County, Razavi Khorasan Province, Iran. At the 2006 census, its population was 22, in 6 families.

References 

Populated places in Bajestan County